Joseph Simpson (born 19 May 1958) is a Guyanese cricketer. He played in one List A and four first-class matches for Guyana in 1986/87 and 1987/88.

See also
 List of Guyanese representative cricketers

References

External links
 

1958 births
Living people
Guyanese cricketers
Guyana cricketers
Sportspeople from Georgetown, Guyana